The Lord's Supper may refer to:

Eucharist, the Christian rite involving eating bread and drinking wine
The Last Supper, the last meal Jesus of Nazareth shared with his disciples in the collection of Christian Scriptures called The Holy Bible.
The Last Supper (Leonardo da Vinci), a painting by Leonardo da Vinci

See also
The Last Supper (disambiguation)